Mere Khuda was a Pakistani television series which was aired on 2 February 2015 at Hum TV. It starts with Mehmood Akhtar, Nimra Khan, Agha Ali, Sumbul Iqbal, Saba Faisal, Sabahat Ali Bukhari, Javed Sheikh, Seemi Pasha, Kanwar Arsalan, Humayun Ashraf on their leading roles. It had 48 Episodes. It was ended on 20 May 2015. It is directed by Barkat Siddiqui and written by M.Asif.

Plot 
Yasir(Agha Ali) acts as the son of Ahmer(Javed Sheikh) and Surraya(Saba Faisal). Tania(Sumbul Iqbal) acts as wife of Yasir and daughter of (Mehmood Akhtar) and (Seemi Pasha). Aamir(Humayun Ashraf) acts as the brother of Nadia (Eshita Syed, Second wife of Yasir and son-in-law of Ahmer and Surrahya through his wife Saba. Saba(Nimra Ali) acts as Aamir's wife, Ahmer and Surrahya's daughter, Nadia's sister-in-law.

Summary 
Mere Khuda is the story of Ahmer(Javed) and Surrahya(Saba Faisal), who marry to have many sons and daughters. One of their son Yasir(Agha Ali), marries to Tania(Sumbul Iqbal). On the other side, Aamir(Humayun Ashraf), marries to Saba(daughter of Ahmer). Aamir's father collapses but recovers. Second time, He feels Heart Attack and finally dies. Tania becomes pregnant and has a son. Yasir says that he is not the father of new born child. Tania tries to understand him but he forbids. Yasir divorces only one time to his wife and marries Aamir's sister Nadia. Another Yasir's sister, Lubna cuts her veins and finally dies. Tania says him that you have given me only one time the word of divorce, it cannot be. Yasir doesn't gives. It is said to Aamir that his sister, Nadia has been kidnapped. It shocks to Aamir specially his mother. His mother dies after hearing the news. Aamir says to his wife Saba that she should live now with her parents. Aamir now becomes alone. AHMER tells truth to Tania about his stealing. Tania comes in pressure but leaves him by her father-in-law's permission. Yasir then becomes the real father of the new born child.

Cast 
 Mehmood Akhtar as Tania and Babar's Father
 Eshita Syed as Nadia 
 Jahanzeb Khan as Ali
 Nimra Khan as Saba 
 Agha Ali as Yasir 
 Sumbul Iqbal as Tania
 Saba Faisal as Surahya 
 Sabahat Ali Bukhari as Rihana
 Javed Sheikh as Ahmer
 Seemi Pasha as Tania's mother
 Humayun Ashraf as Aamir
 Kanwar Arsalan as Babar

See also 
 List of programs broadcast by Hum TV

References

External links 
 Mere Khuda Story
 Mere Khuda
 Official website

2015 Pakistani television series debuts
2015 Pakistani television series endings
Pakistani drama television series
Hum TV original programming
Urdu-language telenovelas
Pakistani telenovelas